Ricardo García Posada Airport , formerly El Salvador Bajo Airport, is an airport serving the copper mining community of El Salvador, in the Atacama Region of Chile.

The runway slopes upward to the east.

See also

Transport in Chile
List of airports in Chile

References

External links
El Salvador at OpenStreetMap
El Salvador at OurAirports

El Salvador Airport at FallingRain

Airports in Chile
Airports in Atacama Region